Konstantinos Kamperis (born 10 July 1996) is a Greek professional footballer who plays as a midfielder.

References

1996 births
Living people
Greek footballers
Football League (Greece) players
Super League Greece 2 players
Gamma Ethniki players
Apollon Larissa F.C. players
Association football midfielders
Footballers from Larissa
21st-century Greek people